The Naismith College Player of the Year is an annual basketball award given by the Atlanta Tipoff Club to the top men's and women's collegiate basketball players. It is named in honor of Dr. James Naismith, the inventor of basketball.

History and selection
First awarded exclusively to male players in 1969, the award was expanded to include female players in 1983. Annually before the college season begins in November, a "watchlist" consisting of 50 players is chosen by the Atlanta Tipoff Club board of selectors, comprising head coaches, administrators and media members from across the United States. By February, the list of nominees is narrowed down to 30 players based on performance. In March, four out of the 30 players are selected as finalists and are placed in the final ballot. The final winners are selected in April by both the board of selectors and fan voting via text messaging. The winners receive the Naismith Trophy.

Since its beginning in 1969, the trophy has been awarded to 44 male players and 24 female players. Lew Alcindor of the University of California, Los Angeles (UCLA) and Anne Donovan of Old Dominion University were the first winners, respectively. Bill Walton of UCLA and Ralph Sampson of the University of Virginia have been the only men to win this award multiple times, with both winning three times. Eight women in all have won this award multiple times. Cheryl Miller of the University of Southern California and Breanna Stewart of the University of Connecticut (UConn) are the only three-time winners, while seven others have won it twice: Clarissa Davis of the University of Texas, Dawn Staley of the University of Virginia, Chamique Holdsclaw of the University of Tennessee, Diana Taurasi and Maya Moore of UConn, Seimone Augustus of Louisiana State University, and Brittney Griner of Baylor University. Davis and Moore are the only players of either sex to have won multiple times in non-consecutive years.

Three award winners, two men and one woman, were born in United States territories:
 Alfred "Butch" Lee, who was born in the Commonwealth of Puerto Rico, and
 Tim Duncan and Aliyah Boston, both born in the U.S. Virgin Islands.
The only award winners who have been born outside the jurisdiction of the United States were:
 Andrew Bogut, born in Melbourne, Australia.
  Patrick Ewing, born in Kingston, Jamaica.
  Buddy Hield, born in Freeport, Bahamas.
 Oscar Tshiebwe, born in Lubumbashi, DR Congo.
Five of these players were developed at least partially in the U.S. proper—Lee was raised in Harlem from early childhood; Ewing immigrated to the Boston area at age 12; Boston moved to Worcester, Massachusetts at the same age; Hield attended high school in suburban Wichita, Kansas; and Tshiebwe attended high schools in southwestern Virginia and western Pennsylvania. Duncan did not move to the U.S. proper until he arrived at Wake Forest University, and Bogut lived in Australia until his arrival at the University of Utah.

Duke has had the most male winners with eight, while UConn has had the most female winners, with eleven awards won by seven individuals. The award has been won by a freshman four times: Kevin Durant playing for Texas in 2007, in 2012 by Anthony Davis of Kentucky, Zion Williamson of Duke in 2019, and Paige Bueckers of UConn in 2021.

Winners

Men

Women

Notes

See also

List of U.S. men's college basketball national player of the year awards
Naismith Prep Player of the Year Award

References

External links
 

College basketball player of the year awards in the United States
Awards established in 1969